Coleophora cytisivora is a moth of the family Coleophoridae.

The larvae feed on Cytisus species. They feed on the leaves of their host plant.

References

cytisivora
Moths described in 1995